Uxbridge is a town in Worcester County, Massachusetts first colonized in 1662 and incorporated in 1727. It was originally part of the town of Mendon, and named for the Earl of Uxbridge. The historical society notes that Uxbridge is the "Heart of The Blackstone Valley" and is also known as "the Cradle of the Industrial Revolution". Uxbridge was a prominent Textile center in the American Industrial Revolution. Two Quakers served as national leaders in the American anti-slavery movement. Uxbridge "weaves a tapestry of early America".

Indigenous Nipmuc people near "Wacentug" or “Waentug” (river bend), deeded land to 17th-century settlers. New England towns are beginning to acknowledge their indigenous lands.  Uxbridge reportedly granted rights to America's first colonial woman voter, Lydia Taft, and approved Massachusetts first women jurors. The first hospital for mental illness in America was reportedly established here. Deborah Sampson posed as an Uxbridge soldier, and fought in the American Revolution.  A 140-year legacy of manufacturing military uniforms and clothing began with 1820 power looms. Uxbridge became famous for woolen cashmeres. "Uxbridge Blue", was the first US Air Force Dress Uniform. BJ's Wholesale Club distribution warehouse is a major employer today.

Uxbridge had a population of 14,162 at the 2020 United States Census.

History

Colonial era, Revolution, Quakers, and abolition 
John Eliot started Nipmuc Praying Indian villages. Several praying Indian towns included Waentug (or Wacentug) and “Rice City” (later settled as Mendon.)  “Great John”, sold Squimshepauk plantation to settlers in September of 1663, "for 24 pound Ster". Mendon began in 1667, and burned in King Phillips War. Western Mendon became Uxbridge in 1727, and Farnum House held the first town meeting. John Adams’ uncle, Nathan Webb, was the first called minister of the colony's first new Congregational church in the Great Awakening. The American Taft family origins are intertwined with Uxbridge and Mendon. Lydia Taft reportedly voted in the 1756 town meeting, considered as a first for colonial women.

Seth and Joseph Read and Simeon Wheelock joined Committees of Correspondence. Baxter Hall was a Minuteman drummer. Seth Read fought at Bunker Hill. Washington stopped at Reed's tavern, en route to command the Continental Army. Samuel Spring was one of the first chaplains of the American Revolution. Deborah Sampson enlisted as "Robert Shurtlieff of Uxbridge". Shays' Rebellion also began here, and Governor John Hancock quelled Uxbridge riots. Simeon Wheelock died protecting the Springfield Armory. Seth Reed was instrumental in adding "E pluribus unum" to U.S. coins. Washington slept here on his Inaugural tour while traveling the Middle Post Road.

Quakers including Richard Mowry migrated here from Smithfield, Rhode Island, and built mills, railroads, houses, tools and Conestoga wagon wheels. Southwick's store housed the Social and Instructive Library. Friends Meetinghouse, next to Moses Farnum's farm, had prominent abolitionists Abby Kelley Foster and Effingham Capron as members. Capron led the 450 member local anti-slavery society. Brister Pierce, formerly a slave in Uxbridge, was a signer of an 1835 petition to Congress demanding abolition of slavery and the slave trade in the District of Columbia. Local influences from the First and Second Great Awakenings can be seen with the early Congregational and Quaker traditions.

Early transportation, education, public health and safety 
The Tafts built the Middle Post Road's Blackstone River bridge in 1709. "Teamsters" drove horse "team" freight wagons on the Worcester-Providence stage route. The Blackstone Canal brought horse-drawn barges to Providence through Uxbridge for overnight stops. The "crossroads village" was a junction on the Underground Railroad. The P&W Railroad ended canal traffic in 1848.

A 1732 vote "set up a school for ye town of Uxbridge". A grammar school was followed by 13 one-room district school houses, built for $2000 in 1797. Uxbridge Academy (1818) became a prestigious New England prep school.

Uxbridge voted against the smallpox vaccine. Samuel Willard treated smallpox victims, was a forerunner of modern psychiatry, and ran the first hospital for mental illness in America. Vital records recorded many infant deaths, the smallpox death of Selectman Joseph Richardson, "Quincy", "dysentary", and tuberculosis deaths. Leonard White recorded a malaria outbreak here in 1896 that led to firsts in the control of malaria as a mosquito-borne infection. Uxbridge led Massachusetts in robberies for a quarter of the year in 1922, and the town voted to hire its first nighttime police patrolman.

Industrial era: 19th century to late 20th century 
Bog iron and three iron forges marked the colonial era, with the inception of large-scale industries beginning around 1775. Examples of this development can be seen in the work of Richard Mowry, who built and marketed equipment to manufacture woolen, linen, or cotton cloth, and gristmills, sawmills, distilleries, and large industries. Daniel Day built the first woolen mill in 1809. By 1855, 560 local workers made  of cloth.  Uxbridge reached a peak of over twenty different industrial mills. A small silver vein at Scadden, in southwest Uxbridge, led to unsuccessful commercial mining in the 1830s.

Innovations included power looms, vertical integration of wool to clothing, cashmere wool-synthetic blends, "wash and wear", yarn spinning techniques, and latch hook kits. Villages included mills, shops, worker housing, and farms. Wm. Arnold's Ironstone cotton mill, later made Kentucky Blue Jeans, and Seth Read's gristmill, later housed Bay State Arms. Hecla and Wheelockville housed American Woolen, Waucantuck Mill, Hilena Lowell's shoe factory, and Draper Corporation. Daniel Day, Jerry Wheelock, and Luke Taft used water-powered mills. Moses Taft's (Central Woolen) operated continuously making Civil War cloth.

North Uxbridge housed Clapp's 1810 cotton mill, Chandler Taft's and Richard Sayles' Rivulet Mill, the granite quarry, and Rogerson's village. Crown and Eagle Mill was "a masterpiece of early industrial architecture". Blanchard's granite quarry provided curb stones to New York City, the Statue of Liberty and regional public works projects. Peter Rawson Taft's grandson, William Howard Taft, visited Samuel Taft House.

John Sr., Effingham and John W. Capron's mill pioneered US satinets and woolen power looms. Charles A. Root, Edward Bachman, and Harold Walter expanded Bachman-Uxbridge, and exhibited leadership in women's fashion. The company manufactured US Army uniforms for the Civil War, World War I, World War II, the nurse corps, and the first Air Force dress uniforms, dubbed "Uxbridge Blue". Time magazine covered Uxbridge Worsted's proposed buyout to be the top US woolen company. The largest plant of one of the largest US yarn companies, Bernat Yarn, was located here from the 1960s to the 1980s. A historic company called Information Services operated from Uxbridge, and managed subscription services for The New Republic, among other publications, in the later 20th century.

Late 20th century to present 

State and national parks developed around mills and rivers were restored. The Great Gatsby (1974) and Oliver's Story (1978) were filmed locally including at Stanley Woolen Mill. The Blackstone Valley National Historic Park contains the Blackstone Canal Heritage State Park,  of the Blackstone River Greenway, the Southern New England Trunkline Trail (which has the interesting SNETT stone chamber south of Lee pond), West Hill Dam, a 567-acre wildlife refuge, parcels of the Metacomet Land Trust, and Cormier Woods. 60 Federalist homes were added to 54 national and 375 state-listed historic sites, including Georgian Elmshade (where War Secretary Alphonso Taft had recounted local family history at a famous reunion). Capron's wooden mill survived a 2007 fire at the Bernat Mill. Stanley mill is being restored while Waucantuck Mill was mostly razed. In 2013 multiple fires again affected the town, including a historic bank building and a Quaker home from the early 1800s. See National historic sites.

In 2017, a new $9.25 million fire station was completed on Main Street next to Town Hall. Voters approved the 14,365 square-foot station in 2015. The station has five bays to accommodate modern fire trucks, a radio and server room for computer and phone servers. The second floor includes a fitness room, kitchen, and showers for staff. The station is located in the historic district, and was built in consultation with the Uxbridge Historic District Commission. The old post office and fire station were demolished to make room for the new station. Context Architecture was the designer.

Notable people 

 Benjamin Adams, Congressman
 Willard Bartlett, New York Chief Justice
 Franklin Bartlett, Congressman

 Nicholas Baylies was born and raised in Uxbridge, and served as a Justice of the Vermont Supreme Court.

 Ezra ("T".) Taft Benson, was an LDS Church Apostle, Hawaii missionary, and Utah legislator. Chandler Taft built the 1814 Rivulet Mill
 Alice Bridges, won an Olympic bronze in Berlin
 Phineas Bruce, Congressman
 Edward P. Bullard, started Bullard Machine tools, whose designs enabled auto manufacturing and industry
 Effingham Capron, led Uxbridge as a center for pre-Civil War anti-slavery activities, and was a state and national anti-slavery leader, and an industrialist
 Daniel Day, a Taft, started the third US woolen mill
 Tim Fortugno, played for the California Angels and Chicago White Sox
 Albert Harkness, Uxbridge High; academic latin scholar; published multiple works
 Jacqueline Liebergott, was president of Emerson College
 Arthur MacArthur Sr., was a Lt. Governor, Chief Justice and Douglas MacArthur's grandfather
 Joshua Macomber, Educator
 Richard Moore, recent Senate President Pro Tem (MA), was a FEMA executive, a past President of the Conference of State Legislatures, and a principal architect of Massachusetts's landmark health care law
 William Augustus Mowry, Educator 
 Jeannine Oppewall, has four Academy Award nominations for best art direction
 Willard Preston, the 4th University of Vermont President, published famous sermons while later serving the Independent Presbyterian Church of Savannah, Georgia
 Seth Reed, fought at Bunker Hill, was instrumental in adding "E pluribus unum" to U.S. coins, and was a founder of Erie, Pennsylvania and Geneva, New York
 Joseph Read was a Colonel in the American Revolutionary War. 
 Brian Skerry, is a National Geographic photojournalist, protecting global sea life
 Edward Sullivan, won a Congressional Medal of Honor in the Spanish–American War
 Robert Taft I, was patriarch to the Taft family political dynasty
 Robert Taft, 2nd, was a Selectman
 Josiah Taft, wealthy landowner, husband of Lydia Taft
 Lydia (Chapin) Taft, first woman to vote in America
 Bezaleel Taft Sr., served as an American Revolution Captain, state representative and state senator
 Bezaleel Taft Jr., state representative and state Senator. Owned historic Elmshade Taft Family homestead 
 Samuel Taft, hosted George Washington on his post-inaugural tour
 Luke Taft, built two water powered textile mills
 Moses Taft, built Stanley Woolen Mill and implicated in the Boston Molasses Disaster
 Peter Rawson Taft I, was the grandfather of William Howard Taft
 Nathan Webb, First called minister at new Congregational Church, first mentioned in Great Awakening period, was John Adams‘ uncle
 Arthur K. Wheelock Jr., was curator of Northern Baroque Art at the National Gallery of Art from 1975 to his retirement in 2018
 Paul C. Whitin, founded the Whitin Machine Works; transformed cotton machine manufacturing
 Charles Vacanti, Anasthesiologist; Tissue engineering; Stem Cells; Known for the Vacanti Mouse

Government 

Uxbridge has a Board of Selectmen and town meeting government.

Local government granted the first woman in America the right to vote, nixed a smallpox vaccine in 1775, and defied the Massachusetts Secretary of State by approving women jurors. The 2009 Board of Health made Uxbridge the third community in the US to ban tobacco sales in pharmacies, but later reversed this.

State agencies control county elected offices, and Uxbridge has a District Courthouse but no gaol.

Geography 

It borders Douglas, Mendon, Millville, Northbridge, and Sutton, Massachusetts, plus the Rhode Island towns of Burrillville and North Smithfield.

Adjacent cities and towns

Climate 

A USDA hardiness zone 5 continental climate prevails with snowfall extremes from November to April. The highest recorded temperature was 104 F, in July 1975, and the lowest, −25 F in January 1957.

Demographics 

The 2010 United States Census population was 13,457, representing a growth rate of 20.6%, with 5,056 households, a density rate of 166.31 units per square mile. 95.7% were White, 1.7% Asian, 0.90% Hispanic, 0.3% African American, and 1.4% other. Population density was 442.66 people/ mile2 (170.77/km). Per capita income was $24,540, and 4.7% fell below the poverty line. There were 9,959 registered voters in 2010.

Economy 
High tech, services, distribution, life sciences, hospitality, local government, education and tourism offer local jobs. A 618,000 square feet (57,400 m2) distribution center serves Fortune 500 BJ's Wholesale Club's, northern division. Unemployment was 3.9%, lower than the state average .

Education 

Local schools include the Earl D. Taft Early Learning Center (Pre-K–3), Whitin Intermediate School (4–7), Uxbridge High School (8–12), and Our Lady of the Valley Regional.

Uxbridge is also a member of one of the thirteen towns of the Blackstone Valley Regional Vocational School District. Uxbridge students in eighth grade have the opportunity to apply to Blackstone Valley Regional Vocational Technical High School, serving grades 9–12.

The New York Times called Uxbridge education reforms a "little revolution" to meet family needs.

Healthcare 

Tri-River Family Health Center (University of Massachusetts Medical School) offers primary care. Milford Regional, Landmark Medical Center, hospices and long term care are nearby or local.

Transportation

Rail 
The nearest MBTA Commuter Rail stops are Forge Park/495 on the Franklin Line and Grafton and Worcester on the Framingham/Worcester Line, 15 miles away. The Northeast Corridor Providence Amtrak station has trains with top speeds of 150 MPH. The Providence and Worcester Railroad freight line passes two former local stations.

Highways 
 Route 146 links Worcester,  I-290, and  I-90 to Providence at  I-95 and  I-295.  Route 16 links to Connecticut via  I-395, and Boston, by  I-495.  Route 122 connects Northbridge and Woonsocket.  Route 146A goes into North Smithfield.  Route 98 leads to Burrillville.

Airports 
TF Green State Airport Warwick-Providence, RI, Worcester Regional Airport, and Boston Logan International Airport have commercial flights. A private air strip, Sky Glen Airport on Quaker Highway, is still listed on FAA sites, though the map location shows it within a dense industrial park, and at its peak of operations, it saw very low traffic.

Points of interest 

 "Uxbridge", A film by Chris Bilodeau Photography (2017)
 National historic sites
John C. Farnum House, Uxbridge Historical Society Museum,  
 Lt. Simeon Wheelock House, Uxbridge common district, 1768
 Friends meetinghouse, 
 Taft House, 1789 inaugural tour visit of George Washington and 1910 visit of Uxbridge grandson, William Howard Taft
 Crown and Eagle Cotton Mill, 
 Elmshade, site of historic Taft family reunion of 1874
 Bernat Mill, formerly Capron Mill, and Uxbridge Worsted Company
 Stanley Woolen Mill, also once known as Central Woolen, Calumet, and Moses Taft Mill
 Stanley Woolen Mill
 Blackstone River Valley National Heritage Corridor
 National Park Service, valley sites: Millville & Uxbridge
 Blackstone Canal at River Bend Farm
 Blackstone River and Canal Heritage State Park
 River Bend Farm and Canal
 West Hill Dam and recreation area
 Walking tour of Uxbridge
 Blissful Meadows Golf Club

Photos

See also 
 List of notable Uxbridge people by century
 Linwood, Massachusetts
 List of mill towns in Massachusetts

References

External links 
 
 
 The New Uxbridge Times, local newspaper
 Uxbridge tourism, FIrst Night Celebration
 Uxbridge Community TV streaming; Public, educational, and government access (PEG) cable TV channel
 Nipmuc nation – Uxbridge began as a subdivision of Mendon which had been carved from the original Squinshepauk Plantation, sold by “Great John” of the Nipmuc to settlers from Braintree, Massachusetts in 1662
   PBS Special:"After the Mayflower, Nipmuc Language, We Shall Remain", with Native Speaker, David Tall Pine White
  town info from Mass online, Preserve America Community
  [Berroco Inc. Continuation of a 200-year family textile/yarn enterprise]
 Uxbridge on "New England Byways", 1998 WBZ TV plus Christmas eve video of Uxbridge on youtube.com
 Grafton Nipmuck   re-created Nipmuc village, CT
 Seth & Hannah Reed
 Abby Kelley Foster, Worcester women's history project

 
Populated places established in 1662
Industrial Revolution
History of the textile industry
History of religion in the United States
1662 establishments in Massachusetts